Patrick J. Hynes (March 12, 1884 – March 12, 1907) was an outfielder in Major League Baseball.

After sitting on the St. Louis Browns bench for most of the 1904 season, Hynes went down to the minor leagues in 1905 and 1906. In March 1907, on his 23rd birthday, he was shot by a bartender over a credit dispute.

References

External links
 Baseball-Reference.com page

1884 births
1907 deaths
Major League Baseball outfielders
St. Louis Cardinals players
Baseball players from Missouri
Vicksburg Hill Billies players
Minneapolis Millers (baseball) players
Milwaukee Brewers (minor league) players
Deaths by firearm in Missouri
Male murder victims
People murdered in Missouri
American murder victims